These are the Billboard Hot 100 number-one hits of 1978.

That year, 11 acts first hit number one, such as Player, Yvonne Elliman, Deniece Williams, John Travolta, The Commodores, A Taste of Honey, Exile, Nick Gilder, Anne Murray, Donna Summer, and Chic. Johnny Mathis, previously having hit number one prior to the creation of the Hot 100, earns his first number one song on the chart. The Bee Gees and younger sibling Andy Gibb were the only acts to have more than one song hit number one, having three songs and two songs respectively. Barry Gibb wrote or co-wrote 7 of the number one songs of the year.

Chart history

Number-one artists

See also
1978 in music
List of Cash Box Top 100 number-one singles of 1978

References

Sources
Fred Bronson's Billboard Book of Number 1 Hits, 5th Edition
Joel Whitburn's Top Pop Singles 1955-2008, 12 Edition
Joel Whitburn Presents the Billboard Hot 100 Charts: The Seventies
Additional information obtained can be verified within Billboard's online archive services and print editions of the magazine.

United States Hot 100
1978